Harry Massey was a politician in Queensland, Australia. He was a member of the Queensland Legislative Assembly for Toowong.

Early life 
He was born in Melbourne, Victoria, on 6 June 1888.  He became President of  the Australian Natives' Association, Melbourne Branch at 21 years of age. He was also prominent in the YMCA, a member of the Commercial Travellers' Association, the Royal Queensland Yacht Club, the Constitutional Club and Indooroopilly Golf Club.

Politics 
Massey was elected as an alderman of the Brisbane City Council for the Toowong ward in 1931 and held that role until 1937.

He was elected to the Queensland Legislative Assembly on 2 April 1938 as a member of the United Australia Party. He remained an elected member until 15 April 1944. He did not receive Queensland People's Party endorsement for the 1944 state election and ran as an independent, but he was defeated.

References

Members of the Queensland Legislative Assembly
1880s births
Year of death missing
United Australia Party members of the Parliament of Queensland
1962 deaths